First Baptist Church is a historic church on College Street in Paintsville, Kentucky.

History 
The original building was built in 1907 in a Late Gothic Revival style and added to the National Register in 1989.  It was located on the corner of Fourth and College Street.  The church occupied the building on Fourth Street until October 1, 1967, when the church congregation moved into the present structure on the corner of Third and College Streets.

Associations 
First Baptist Church Paintsville is associated with the Enterprise Association of Southern Baptists, Kentucky Baptist Convention  as well as the Southern Baptist Convention and is a member of the Paintsville Ministerial Association.

References

External links
Official Website

Baptist churches in Kentucky
National Register of Historic Places in Johnson County, Kentucky
Gothic Revival church buildings in Kentucky
Churches completed in 1907
20th-century Baptist churches in the United States
Churches in Johnson County, Kentucky
Churches on the National Register of Historic Places in Kentucky
Southern Baptist Convention churches
1907 establishments in Kentucky
Paintsville, Kentucky